Damir Atiković (born 17 February 1971) is a Croatian table tennis player. He competed in the men's doubles event at the 1996 Summer Olympics.

References

1971 births
Living people
Croatian male table tennis players
Olympic table tennis players of Croatia
Table tennis players at the 1996 Summer Olympics
Sportspeople from Zagreb
20th-century Croatian people